Stanley Charles Moon (8 January 1927 – 3 August 2012) was an Australian rules footballer who played with Collingwood in the Victorian Football League (VFL).		
		
Moon earlier served in the Royal Australian Air Force during World War II, enlisting shortly after his eighteenth birthday.

Notes

External links 
		
Profile on Collingwood Forever

1927 births
2012 deaths
Australian rules footballers from Victoria (Australia)
Collingwood Football Club players